Walter Marshall may refer to:
 Walter Marshall, Baron Marshall of Goring (1932–1996), theoretical physicist
 Walter Marshall (Puritan) (1628–1680), English, non-conformist Puritan pastor and author
 Walter Marshall (cricketer) (1853–1943), English cricketer
 Walter V. Marshall (1890–1967), American architect and university administrator